Molfsee is a municipality in the district of Rendsburg-Eckernförde, in Schleswig-Holstein, Germany. It is situated on the river Eider, approx. 1 km southwest of Kiel.

Molfsee is the seat of the Amt ("collective municipality") Molfsee.

In popular culture, Molfsee is also a song by electro-artist Ulrich Schnauss, along with Blumenthal.

Molfsee is known for its huge Open Air Museum called "Schleswig-Holsteinisches Freilichtmuseum" which opened in 1965. Over 70 regional historical houses can be visited. There are some attractions like a heritage railway and historical employed persons, for example smiths, basketmakers, potters and weavers. During the year there are special market places.

References

Rendsburg-Eckernförde